Georgia v. Tennessee Copper Co., (1907), was a case in which the Supreme Court of the United States held that States, as quasi-sovereigns, have parens patriae standing to sue for environmental harms, in this case fumes from copper mining.

See also 
 List of United States Supreme Court cases involving standing

References

United States Supreme Court cases
1907 in United States case law